Todd Hiett (born July 9, 1967) is an American rancher and Republican politician from Kellyville, Oklahoma. He served in the Oklahoma House of Representatives from 1995 until 2007. During his final two years in office, Hiett served as the Speaker of the House. Hiett was the first Republican to hold that position in over eight decades.

Once he completed the maximum twelve-year term (term limits are constitutionally mandated in Oklahoma), Hiett launched a campaign to succeed Mary Fallin as the Lieutenant Governor of Oklahoma. Hiett lost the 2006 race to Democrat Jari Askins.

Personal life
Hiett was born in Kellyville, Oklahoma to Jim and Beverly Hiett. He is married to Bridget Anne Beil, with whom he has three children named Jimmy, John and Hillary.

Political career

Hiett has said he was motivated to enter politics when the Oklahoma Department of Agriculture quarantined his herd of cattle, and extended the quarantine even after receiving blood tests on the animals that were negative for any disease. Hiett had to appear before the state Board of Agriculture to get the quarantine lifted.

Representing the 29th House District, Hiett served in the Oklahoma House from 1995 to 2007, quickly becoming the House Minority Leader in 2002. After the Republicans took control of the House in 2005, Hiett was elected Speaker, the first Republican to serve in over eighty years. Hiett is only the second Republican to hold that position. The first was George B. Schwabe, who served from 1921-23.

Hiett entered the Republican primary election to replace outgoing Republican Mary Fallin as Lieutenant Governor of Oklahoma.  In the primaries on July 25, 2006, Hiett faced Nancy Riley and Scott Pruitt. Riley received 23% of the vote, Pruitt received 34%, and Hiett received 43%. Hiett, according to Oklahoma state law, had to face Pruitt in a runoff, with the winner receiving the party's nomination.

Following the run-off election on August 22, 2006, Hiett received 66,217 votes and 50.92% as opposed to Pruitt's 63,812 votes and 49.08%. Hiett was the Republican nominee for Lt. Governor, but he lost to Democratic House Minority Leader Jari Askins in the November general election.

Electoral history

References

External links
 Todd Hiett for Lt Governor

|-

|-

1967 births
20th-century American politicians
21st-century American politicians
Living people
People from Creek County, Oklahoma
Ranchers from Oklahoma
Speakers of the Oklahoma House of Representatives
Republican Party members of the Oklahoma House of Representatives
Corporation Commissioners of Oklahoma